"Waffle" is a 1999 single by American rock band Sevendust from their second album Home. A shot of the video is seen in the film Down to Earth.

Two different versions of the song exist. One is the version that's on the album, while the other, mixed by Tom Lord-Alge, is the one used as the single. The only truly noticeable difference between the two versions is that the Tom Lord-Alge mix has a smoother drum track and a larger more clean sound with the guitars turned up louder in the mix and more reverb on the vocals. The Tom Lord-Alge mix is the one used on Best Of (Chapter One 1997–2004). "Waffle" peaked on the Billboard Mainstream Rock and Modern Rock Tracks at number 23 and number 33, respectively.

According to Morgan Rose, the song's title was unknowingly coined by Sharon Osbourne, during a phone call he had with her while the band was writing the song.

Track listing

All live songs were recorded live at the Metro in Chicago during the Live and Loud TV special, which can be located on the Retrospect DVD.

Charts

Release history

References

Sevendust songs
1999 songs
2000 singles
Songs written by Clint Lowery
Songs written by Morgan Rose
Songs written by Lajon Witherspoon
Songs written by John Connolly (musician)
Songs written by Vinnie Hornsby
TVT Records singles
Music videos directed by Marcos Siega